Melnychenko or Melnichenko is a surname of Ukrainian-language origin. It is common in Ukraine, Russia, and Belarus. Notable people with the surname include:

Anastasia Melnichenko (born 1984), Ukrainian activist
Andrey Melnichenko (born 1972), Belarusian-Russian billionaire
Hanna Melnychenko (born 1983), Ukrainian heptathlete
Ilona Melnichenko, Ukrainian ice dancer for the Soviet Union
Mykola Melnychenko, Ukrainian KGB officer
Yuriy Melnichenko (born 1972), Kazakhstani wrestler

See also
 
 

Ukrainian-language surnames
Surnames of Ukrainian origin